Black Rider or Black Riders may refer to:

Arts and entertainment
 Black Rider (comics), a Marvel Comics Western character
 The Black Rider, a 1990 stage musical by Tom Waits, Robert Wilson and William S. Burroughs
 The Black Rider (album), a 1993 album by Tom Waits
 "Black Rider" (song), a 2020 song by Bob Dylan
 The Black Rider (film), a 1954 British thriller film directed by Wolf Rilla
 Schwarzfahrer, also known as Black Rider, a short film directed by Pepe Danquart, which won an Academy Award in 1993
 Nazgûl, Sauron's chief servants in the fantasy book The Lord of the Rings by J.R.R. Tolkien

People
 "The Black Rider", nickname of Nikolaos Plastiras (1883–1953), Greek general and politician

See also
 Reiter or Schwarze Reiter (black riders), German cavalrymen armed with pistols
 The Black Riders and Other Lines, an 1895 book of poetry by Stephen Crane